Cornelius Otis Johnson (June 12, 1943 – July 11, 2017) was a former American football offensive guard who played six seasons with the Baltimore Colts of the National Football League (NFL). He was drafted by the Colts in the eighth round of the 1967 NFL Draft. He played college football at Virginia Union University and attended Richmond High School in Richmond, Virginia. He was a member of the Colts team that won Super Bowl V. He was also a member of the Harrisburg Capitols and The Hawaiians.

Professional career
Johnson was selected by the Baltimore Colts with the 204th pick in the 1967 NFL Draft. He played in 74 games, starting seven, for the Colts from 1967 to 1973. He also played for the Harrisburg Capitols of the Atlantic Coast Football League in 1967. The Capitols served as Baltimore's farm club. The Colts won Super Bowl V against the Dallas Cowboys on January 17, 1971.

Johnson played in nineteen games for The Hawaiians of the World Football League from 1974 to 1975.

Personal life
Johnson wears a prosthetic leg after being told, upon examination of a leg injury, that he had to have his lower right leg amputated due to complications from diabetes and MRSA. He is also blind in his right eye and partially blind in his left due to a stroke. He and his wife previously owned a helicopter business in Hawaii. Johnson had served as a mentor to student athletes in Prescott, Arizona ever since he arrived in the area during the late 1990s. He died on July 11, 2017.

References

External links
Just Sports Stats
Fanbase profile

1943 births
2017 deaths
American amputees
Sportspeople with limb difference
American blind people
Sportspeople with a vision impairment
Players of American football from Richmond, Virginia
African-American players of American football
American football offensive guards
Virginia Union Panthers football players
Baltimore Colts players
The Hawaiians players
African-American businesspeople
Businesspeople from Virginia
20th-century American businesspeople
American aviation businesspeople
20th-century African-American sportspeople
21st-century African-American people